Route 106 is a highway in New Brunswick, Canada; running from an intersection with Route 1 and western intersection in Route 905 in Petitcodiac to the intersection of Trans-Canada Highway (Route 2) and the southern terminus of Route 940 at Sackville; a distance of 91.8 kilometres. 

From Petitcodiac, Route 106 is known as the "Old Post road" and crosses the river to the passing the eastern terminus of Route 885 to the north bank of the Petitcodiac River. From here, the route turns north east, traveling through Petitcodiac East, crossing Route 1 at exit 239 in River Glade and continuing to Salisbury where it briefly merges with Route 112. The route passes through Boundary Creek then Allison where it is known as "Salisbury Rd" and enters the neighbourhood of Lakeview in Moncton. From here, the route travels around the Petitcodiac Causeway then known as "Main St" passing through Downtown Moncton, the southern terminus of Route 15 and into Dieppe.

From Dieppe, Route 106 is known as "Champlain Street", then changes to "Acadie Ave" at the intersection of Route 132 which leaves the city to the southeast passing through the neighbourhood of Chartersville then Saint-Anselme, then Fox Creek passing the northern intersection of Route 925. The road continues in a southeasterly direction where it is known as "Vallee Road", passing Folly Lake as it enters Memramcook, where it turns south at the western terminus of Route 933. Here the route is known as "Royal Road" passing the western terminus of Route 925 to follow the east bank of the Memramcook River passing through Upper Dorchester, Middleton then entering Dorchester. The route then passes the northern terminus of Route 935 continuing east through Frosty Hollow then enters Sackville where it is known as "Main Street".

History
Route 106 follows the original routing of Route 2 until the 1950s, when an entirely new limited-access route was constructed (mainly to bypass Moncton). The former route became Route 2A, but it was renumbered Route 6 in 1965. The 106 number was adopted in 1984 during a reclassification of provincial highways.

Route 106 was extended west to Petitcodiac from its former end at River Glade in 1997 when another section of the Trans-Canada Highway was bypassed.

Former routes
There have been two highways formerly numbered Route 106 in New Brunswick.

The first Route 106 followed the west bank of the Saint John River between Hartland and Perth-Andover between 1965 and 1968, when the Florenceville Bridge opened as part of the Trans-Canada Highway project. The former Route 106 is now part of Route 130 north of Florenceville, and Route 103 south of Florenceville.

The second Route 106 followed the Broad Road from Oromocto to Route 7 at Geary between 1976 and 1984. This route, a former alignment of Route 7, became part of Route 660, but is no longer numbered.

See also
List of New Brunswick provincial highways

References

106
106
Transport in Dieppe, New Brunswick
Transport in Moncton
Former segments of the Trans-Canada Highway